Foel Wen South Top is a top of Foel Wen in north east Wales. It is one of the summits found on the most easterly of Cadair Berwyn's long south ridges.

The summit is grassy, and unmarked. To the north lies Tomle, while to the south lies its Mynydd Tarw.

References

External links
www.geograph.co.uk : photos of Cadair Berwyn and surrounding area

Hewitts of Wales
Mountains and hills of Denbighshire
Nuttalls
Mountains and hills of Powys